Doña Bella is a 2010 Spanish language remake of the original 1986 Brazilian production titled Dona Beija, commissioned and produced by Telefutura. The latter series was derived from various Brazilian novels centered on the life of historical persona Ana Jacinta de São José.

The series aired weeknights at 8pm central on Telefutura starting on April 25, 2011 and ended its run on September 19, 2011 with 97 episodes.

The opening theme song is Bella by Carlos Aguera y Mariatta.

Plot
The telenovela incorporates themes of forbidden love, betrayal and revenge, as well as personal sacrifice and perseverance.

Bella Cepeda is a beautiful young woman who is in love with her childhood friend, Antonio Segovia, a member of a prominent conservative family.  As a consequence of her unequal social station, Bella has to contend with the inevitable heartaches caused by the Segovia family's distrust and contempt of her relationship with Antonio. The central character's life worries are amplified when she becomes the target of desire of an unscrupulous, yet powerful businessman, Román Montero, who is lured to the banana exporting region from the capital city with the hopes of tapping into the underdeveloped  local economy. Infatuated by Bella, Señor Montero intends to make her his lover, however, upon rejection by the maiden, he abducts her and secludes her in his grand estate.

During her captivity, nobody, particularly her beloved Antonio, comes to her rescue. On the contrary, Antonio is led to believe that Bella willingly initiates a romance with Montero, motivated by avarice. Further compounding the heroine's misfortune is the loss of her remaining family member, effectively becoming deprived of family and love. Abandoned by loved ones and abused by a degenerate, a young Bella's heart is poisoned with bitterness. Notwithstanding, she refuses to suffocate under her calamity and determines to take back charge of her life. She accomplishes her goal by engaging in the sex trade, soon being able to amass wealth and a particular prestige. As a whole new woman, she returns to her home village, Agua Hermosa,  with a singular aim in mind: to take revenge against those that did her wrong. At the top of her list are her former lover Antonio and her former tormentor Román.

Cast 
 Zharick León - Bella Zepeda
 Fabián Ríos - Antonio Segovia
 Marcelo Buquet - Román Montero
 Luis Fernando Salas - David
 Stephanie Cayo - Evangelina Rosales
 Jorge López - Dr. Alcides Guzmán
 Javier Delguidice - Pablo Segovia
 Pedro Rendón - Andrés Mendoza
 Xilena Aycardi - Juanita González
 Armando Gutiérrez - Moisés Pérez
 Gloria Zapata - Cecilia de Segovia
 Gloria Montoya - Silvia Salazar
 Alfonso Ortiz - Padre Miguel Arteaga
 Luis Fernando Munera - Fernando Cepeda
 María Luisa Flores - Inés Segovia
 Daniel Arenas - Nicolás Ayala
 Edmundo Troya - Julián Rosales
 Sandra Pérez - Graciela de Rosales
 Luis Enrique Roldán - Claudio Mendoza
 Linda Lucía Callejas - Carolina de Mendoza
 Juan Pablo Obregón - Aurelio Sotomayor
 Alejandra Ávila - Consuelo Molina
 Margarita Amado - Delia de Fernández
 Ana María Oyola - Mariana Oyola
Luz Del Sol Neisa - Maria Antonia Zepeda
Mariana Garzón - Andrea Fernanda Mendoza Zepeda

External links
 
 Doña Bella | TeleFutura 

2009 telenovelas
2009 American television series debuts
2009 American television series endings
2009 Colombian television series debuts
2009 Colombian television series endings
Colombian telenovelas
Spanish-language American telenovelas
RCN Televisión telenovelas
American television series based on Brazilian television series
Television shows set in Bogotá
Television shows set in Marseille